Yen Chen-hsing (10 July 1912 – 7 January 2005) was a Chinese-born engineer, educator, and politician based in Taiwan.

Early life and education 
Yen graduated from National Tsing Hua University in Beijing and moved to the United States in 1937 to continue his education. He earned a master's degree and doctorate from the Department of Mechanics and Hydraulics at the University of Iowa in 1938 and 1941, respectively.

Career 
Upon graduation, Yen returned to China and helped construct the Burma Road. After World War II, Yen devised plans to dam the Yellow River. He joined the faculty of Henan University shortly before moving to Taiwan in 1949, along with Chiang Kai-shek's Nationalist government. In Taiwan, Yen became chief engineer of Kaohsiung Harbor before assuming the presidency of National Cheng Kung University in 1957. He stepped down in 1965 and was named Minister of Education. 

The next year, Yen began concurrently serving as chairman of the National Youth Commission. As education minister, Yen extended the length of compulsory education programs in Taiwan from six years to nine years and helped establish many junior colleges. Yen left the Ministry of Education in 1969 and ended his tenure at the National Youth Commission the next year. He stepped down from the Atomic Energy Council in 1971, having held the position since 1966. Yen assumed administrative posts at several universities while working in the government. 

While serving as president of National Chung-Shan Institute of Science and Technology from 1969 to 1971, Yen was also president of National Tsing Hua University until 1970. He then led National Taiwan University from 1970 to 1981. Upon stepping down from NTU, Yen returned to the Atomic Energy Council from 1981 to 1990 and later served President Lee Teng-hui as a senior adviser. Yen was elected to the Academia Sinica in 1982 and awarded the University of Iowa's Distinguished Alumni Award for Achievement in 1984. In 1999, the University of Iowa inducted Yen into its Distinguished Engineering Alumni Academy.

Yen died in January 2005, aged 92. Following his death, the "Chen-Hsing Fluid Dynamics Lab" and "Chen-Hsing Memorial Hall" at National Taiwan University were dedicated in Yen's honor.

References

1912 births
2005 deaths
Chinese Civil War refugees
Chinese mechanical engineers
Engineers from Henan
National Tsing Hua University alumni
University of Iowa alumni
Academic staff of Henan University
Academic staff of the National Cheng Kung University
Academic staff of the National Tsing Hua University
Republic of China politicians from Henan
Presidents of National Taiwan University
Senior Advisors to President Lee Teng-hui
Taiwanese mechanical engineers
Taiwanese Ministers of Education
Taiwanese people from Henan
Chinese expatriates in the United States
Members of Academia Sinica